Dwayne Gray Gaulding Jr. (born February 10, 1998) is an American professional stock car racing driver. He competes full-time in the NASCAR Xfinity Series, driving the No. 08 Chevrolet Camaro and Ford Mustang for SS-Green Light Racing.

Racing career
Gaulding began racing motorbikes at age 4, and raced cars five years later. When he was 10, Gaulding received two Bandolero cars, and won in his first Bandolero race. At age 12, Gaulding was the youngest driver in a NASCAR Legends Division, and won a Legends car national championship, gaining sponsorship from firearm distributor GunBroker.com. Also at age 12, Gaulding defeated NASCAR Sprint Cup Series driver Kevin Harvick at Harvick's karting track, which prompted Harvick to sign Gaulding to Kevin Harvick Incorporated's driver development program. At 13, Gaulding became the youngest Super late model race winner, and was also the youngest driver to win the Pro All Stars Series (PASS) Rookie of the Year Award. After KHI shut down in 2011, he was released from the team's driver development program. When he was 14, Gaulding was volunteering at the Victory Junction Gang Camp when he agreed to five one-year contracts with Krispy Kreme as a sponsor.

K&N Pro Series East

In 2013, Gaulding ran the No. 20 Krispy Kreme Toyota in both the K&N Pro Series East and West. He won the pole position at Richmond International Raceway at 15 years, 2 months, 15 days, becoming the youngest pole-sitter in NASCAR history, more than four months younger than Cole Custer, the previous record holder. In the season-ending Pro Series West race at Phoenix International Raceway, Gaulding spun out Custer on the final lap to win, becoming the youngest race winner in K&N series history at 15 years, 8 months and 30 days. During the year, Gaulding was named to the NASCAR Next program, which highlights NASCAR's future stars. In 2014, Gaulding was hired by NTS Motorsports to run full-time in the K&N East series.

Truck Series
Gaulding joined NTS Motorsports in the No. 20, and ran eight races in the 2014 NASCAR Camping World Truck Series season; he made his Truck Series debut at Martinsville Speedway. On lap 243, Gaulding was running three-wide, and was turned around. Gaulding finished 19th. Gaulding recorded his best finish of the year at Canadian Tire Motorsport Park, finishing 4th in the Chevrolet Silverado 250.

On March 23, 2015, Gaulding was released by NTS Motorsports, and joined Red Horse Racing, making his debut for the team at Martinsville where he finished 17th. He later joined Kyle Busch Motorsports, driving the No. 54 Toyota Tundra in three races at Mosport, New Hampshire and Martinsville.

Xfinity Series

In 2016, Gaulding joined Roush Fenway Racing's driver development program and made his NASCAR Xfinity Series debut in the No. 60 at Bristol Motor Speedway, while also running another round at Richmond.

For the 2019 season, Gaulding drove No. 08 Chevy for SS-Green Light Racing full-time. In April's MoneyLion 300 at Talladega Superspeedway, Gaulding finished a career-best second behind Tyler Reddick.

On January 16, 2020, it was announced that Joe Graf Jr. would take over the No. 08 car for the 2020 NASCAR Xfinity Series season, leaving Gaulding without a ride. Despite losing his full-time seat with the team, Gaulding returned to SS-Green Light for Talladega, where he piloted the No. 07 to an eighth-place run. Another ride opportunity with the same team saw Gaulding score another second-place finish in the Wawa 250 at Daytona International Speedway, being beaten by eventual winner Justin Haley. Gaulding later joined Mike Harmon Racing for a late-season drive at the Charlotte Motor Speedway Roval.

On January 26, 2021, it was reported that Gaulding would return to the Xfinity Series full-time for Jimmy Means Racing. At the conclusion of the Martinsville race, a fight broke out on pit road between Gaulding and Joe Graf Jr. after Gaulding wrecked Graf on lap 177.

Gaulding would only make a handful of starts in 2022, splitting time between Mike Harmon Racing and JD Motorsports with a best finish of 21st at Talladega Superspeedway.

In 2023, Gaulding would return to SS-Green Light Racing in the No. 08 in a mix of Chevrolets and Fords with Blaine Perkins as his teammate.

Cup Series
In late 2016, Gaulding attempted to make his Sprint Cup Series debut at Martinsville, driving the No. 30 car for The Motorsports Group. Gaulding joined BK Racing's No. 23 car for the 2017 season, driving in 33 races. Gaulding was not approved to run the Daytona 500 due to lack of experience on larger tracks (1.5 miles or greater). On June 13, 2017, he was replaced by Ryan Sieg at Michigan. Later in the month, Gaulding announced he had joined Premium Motorsports' No. 55 Camry for the Cup races at Kentucky and Loudon. On June 5, 2017, BK Racing released Gaulding because of financial issues; however, he would later return to the team at Darlington. At Talladega, Gaulding survived a crash-filled race to post his career-best finish of ninth.

Gaulding would return to BK Racing in 2018, but left the team after running the first 17 races as it fell into financial turmoil. He joined StarCom Racing for two races in the No. 99 before moving to Rick Ware Racing. He returned to Ware for the 2019 Food City 500 and a part-time schedule in 2020.

Personal life
Gaulding is the son of Dwayne and Kristin (Martek) Gaulding. A native of Colonial Heights, Virginia, Gaulding's father, Dwayne, was the vice president of operations at NTS Motorsports.

On April 29, 2022, Gaulding's sister McCall became engaged to fellow driver Zane Smith.

Motorsports career results

Career summary

NASCAR
(key) (Bold – Pole position awarded by time. Italics – Pole position earned by points standings. * – Most laps led.)

Cup Series

 Season still in progress
 Ineligible for series points

Daytona 500

Xfinity Series

Gander RV & Outdoors Truck Series

K&N Pro Series East

K&N Pro Series West

ARCA Racing Series
(key) (Bold – Pole position awarded by qualifying time. Italics – Pole position earned by points standings or practice time. * – Most laps led.)

References

External links
 
 

Living people
1998 births
People from Colonial Heights, Virginia
Racing drivers from Virginia
NASCAR drivers
ARCA Menards Series drivers
Kyle Busch Motorsports drivers
RFK Racing drivers